Vokouma is the only commune in the sub-prefecture of Ouanda Djallé in the prefecture of Vakaga in the Central African Republic. Ouanda Djallé, chief town of sub-prefecture is the principal locality of the commune. It owes its name to the watercourse: the Vokouma.

Villages 
The commune consists of 8 villages: Centre Administratif, Dele, Djalle 1, Djalle 2, Djalle 3, Djalle 4, Djalle 5, Soulemaka.

Notes and references

Populated places in Vakaga